William Louis Poteat (1856–1938), also known as "Doctor Billy", was a professor (–1905) and then the seventh president (1905–1927) of Wake Forest College (today, Wake Forest University). Poteat was conspicuous in many civic roles becoming a leader of the Progressive Movement in the South, and a champion of higher education. Though a Baptist, he defended the teaching of evolution as the "divine method of creation", arguing it was fully compatible with Christian beliefs.

Biography
Poteat was born in Caswell County, North Carolina to a noted Baptist, slave-owning family; among his siblings was Ida Isabella Poteat, who taught art at Meredith College for many years. His brother Edwin McNeill Poteat was a minister and educator, serving as president of Furman University from 1903 to 1918. William Louis Poteat went on to graduate with a Bachelor of Arts degree from Wake Forest College (then located in Wake Forest, North Carolina) in 1877.  Shortly after graduating, he was hired by his alma mater as a natural science instructor. He was a public intellectual and leading theological liberal among Baptists in the South.

Evolution

He first taught himself biology before studying at the University of Berlin. His studies convinced him of the Darwinian concepts of natural selection and evolution. Poteat reconciled his scientific conclusions with a modernist or liberal form of Christianity. His beliefs were not shared by more conservative Baptists, who tried to remove him. Poteat fought back and survived, and helped persuade the North Carolina General Assembly to defeat a bill that would have banned the teaching of evolution (as other states had done; see Scopes Monkey Trial).

Presidency at Wake Forest College

He was the first layman to be elected president in Wake Forest College's history. "Dr. Billy" continued to promote growth, hired many outstanding professors, and expanded the science curriculum. He also stirred upheaval among North Carolina Baptists with his strong support of teaching the theory of evolution but eventually won formal support from the Baptist State Convention for academic freedom at the college.

References

Further reading
 Hall, Randal L. "William Louis Poteat: A Leader of the Progressive-Era South (University of Kentucky, 2000)
 Linder, Suzanne Cameron. William Louis Poteat: Prophet of Progress (1966)
 Sanchez, Paul A. "Christianity at the Crossroads: William Louis Poteat and Liberal Religion in the Baptist South" (Dissertation, Southern Baptist Theological Seminary, 2020)
 Woodard, John R. "Poteat, William Louis," *in William S. Powell, ed. Dictionary of North Carolina Biography, vol 5 (1994) 

1856 births
1938 deaths
Presidents of Wake Forest University
Wake Forest University alumni
People from Caswell County, North Carolina
Theistic evolutionists
 People from Yanceyville, North Carolina